Pythons is the second studio album by indie rock band Surfer Blood. It was released in June 2013 under Sire Records and produced by Gil Norton. Following the release of their EP, Tarot Classics, Surfer Blood had been writing songs whilst on tour. The first song to be written for the album is technically "Prom Song", as they have had the guitar parts for this song for a few years now. The album features all the qualities that define Surfer Blood's sound, but is stripped of its reverb and given a more polished production, as opposed to the production that took place in front-man John Paul Pitts' apartment. "Pixies" guitarist Joey Santiago lent the band equipment such as amplifiers and guitars during the album's production, as Norton is a close friend of his because he produced most of the Pixies discography.

Track listing

Personnel
 John Paul Pitts - vocals, guitar 
 Thomas Fekete - guitar, vocals
 Kevin Williams- bass, keyboards, vocals
 Tyler Schwarz - drums
 Gil Norton - producer
 Dan Austin - engineer, programming
 Brian Gardner - mastering
 Rob Schnapf - mixing
 Chris Szczech - mixing assistant
 Brendan Dekora - assistant engineer
 Jeff Sosnow - A&R
 Alex Black - A&R
 Julia Pitts - photography
 Frank Maddocks - art direction, photography
 Esteban Neumann - illustrations

References

External links
Pythons at iTunes.com
Pythons at Amazon.com

2013 albums
Surfer Blood albums
Sire Records albums
Albums produced by Gil Norton
Kanine Records albums